Eastern Orthodoxy in Turkmenistan is a major proportion of Christianity in Turkmenistan. Turkmenistan has a Muslim majority. The Eastern Orthodox Christians are about 5% of the population.

Russian Orthodox Church in Turkmenistan 
The Russian Orthodox Church in Turkmenistan is under the jurisdiction of the Russian Orthodox Bishop of Pyatigorsk and Cherkessiya. There are 12 Russian Orthodox Churches in Turkmenistan, including four in Ashgabat, two in Türkmenabat, and one each in Balkanabat, Baýramaly, Daşoguz, Mary, Tejen, and Turkmenbashy. The senior Russian Orthodox priest in Turkmenistan is based in Ashgabat.

Armenian Apostolic Church in Turkmenistan

The Armenian Apostolic Church has no functioning churches in Turkmenistan. The former Armenian church in Turkmenbashy, built in 1903, is closed and in need of renovation. The Armenian Embassy in Ashgabat and the Armenian Office of Diaspora Affairs operate Sunday schools in Ashgabat, Mary, and Turkmenbashy.

References

See also 

St. Alexander Nevsky Church, Ashgabat
Religion in Turkmenistan
Protestantism in Turkmenistan
Roman Catholicism in Turkmenistan
Eastern Orthodoxy in Uzbekistan
Eastern Orthodoxy in Azerbaijan